Teallite is a sulfide mineral of tin and lead with chemical formula: PbSnS2. It occurs in hydrothermal veins and is sometimes mined as an ore of tin. Teallite forms soft silvery grey mica-like plates and crystallizes in the orthorhombic system. The Mohs hardness is 1.5 to 2 and the specific gravity is 6.4. 

Teallite was first described in 1904 from its type locality in Santa Rosa, Antequera, Bolivia. It was named for the British geologist Jethro Justinian Harris Teall (1849–1924).

See also

 Classification of minerals
 List of minerals
 List of minerals named after people

References

External links

Lead minerals
Tin minerals
Sulfide minerals
Orthorhombic minerals
Minerals in space group 62